Cody James Thompson (born January 11, 1996) is an American football wide receiver for the Seattle Seahawks of the National Football League (NFL). He played college football for the Toledo Rockets.

College career
Thompson was a member of the Toledo Rockets for five seasons. He finished his collegiate career with 181 receptions for 3,312 yards and a school-record 30 touchdowns.

Professional career

Kansas City Chiefs
Thompson signed with the Kansas City Chiefs as an undrafted free agent on May 6, 2019. He was waived during final roster cuts on August 31, 2019, but was signed to the team's practice squad on September 2. Thompson was released by the Chiefs on October 29, 2019.

Seattle Seahawks (first stint)
Thompson was signed by the Seattle Seahawks to their practice squad on October 31, 2019. He was released on November 5, 2019.

Cincinnati Bengals
Thompson was signed by the Cincinnati Bengals to their practice squad on November 19, 2019.

Seattle Seahawks (second stint)
Thompson was re-signed to the Seahawks practice squad on January 8, 2020. He signed a reserve/futures contract with the team on January 14, 2020. Thompson was waived on August 31, 2021, during final roster cuts and was re-signed to the practice squad the following day. He was elevated to the active roster on September 26, 2021, for the team's week 3 game against the Minnesota Vikings and made his NFL debut in the game. He signed a reserve/future contract with the Seahawks on January 10, 2022. He was placed on injured reserve on August 15, 2022.

References

External links
Toledo Rockets bio
Seattle Seahawks bio

1996 births
Living people
American football wide receivers
Toledo Rockets football players
Players of American football from Ohio
Kansas City Chiefs players
Seattle Seahawks players
Cincinnati Bengals players